Stepping Stone is the fourth studio album by American country music artist Lari White. Released on July 28, 1998 as her first album for Lyric Street Records after leaving RCA Nashville. The album's title track was a Top 20 hit on the Billboard Hot Country Singles & Tracks (now Hot Country Songs) charts in mid-1998; "Take Me" and "John Wayne Walking Away" were also released as singles.

The track "Only God Could Stop Me Loving You" was originally recorded by Billy Ray Cyrus on his 1994 album Storm in the Heartland. Canadian country music band Emerson Drive would later record the song for their 2002 debut album Emerson Drive and release it as a single. "You Can't Go Home Again (Flies on the Butter)" was later recorded as "Flies on the Butter (You Can't Go Home Again)" by Wynonna and Naomi Judd on Wynonna's 2003 album What the World Needs Now Is Love, from which it was released as a single.

Track listing

Personnel
Lari White — vocals
Paul Leim — drums
Mike Brignardello — bass
Biff Watson, Chuck Cannon — acoustic guitar
Dann Huff, Jeff King — electric guitar
Matt Rollings, John Hobbs, Steve Nathan — keyboards
Dan Dugmore, Paul Franklin — steel guitar
Aubrey Haynie — fiddle, mandolin
Terry McMillan — percussion
Steve Gibson — mandolin
Chris Rodriguez, Lisa Cochran, Mary Ann Kennedy, Pam Rose — background vocals

Chart performance

References

[ Stepping Stone] at Allmusic

1998 albums
Lari White albums
Albums produced by Dann Huff
Lyric Street Records albums